In electrical engineering, the average rectified value (ARV) of a quantity is the average of its absolute value.

The average of a symmetric alternating value is zero and it is therefore not useful to characterize it. Thus the easiest way to determine a quantitative measurement size is to use the average rectified value. The average rectified value is mainly used to characterize alternating voltage and current. It can be computed by averaging the absolute value of a waveform over one full period of the waveform.

While conceptually similar to the root mean square (RMS), ARV will differ from it whenever a function's absolute value varies locally, as the former then increases disproportionately. The difference is expressed by the form factor

See also 
 Average absolute deviation
 Root mean square
 Form factor (electronics)
 True RMS converter

References

Electric power conversion